Gemma Dryburgh (born 11 June 1993) is a Scottish professional golfer.

Amateur career
Dryburgh played college golf at Tulane University. She competed in the 2014 Curtis Cup and the 2014 Espirito Santo Trophy.

Professional career
Dryburgh played on the LET Access Series in 2015, making the cut in three of four events. She played on the Symetra Tour in 2016 and 2017, making three cuts in five events in 2016 and six cuts in ten events in 2017. She played on the ALPG Tour for the 2016–17 season, notching her first professional victory at the Oatlands Ladies Pro Am.

Dryburgh has played on the Ladies European Tour since 2016 with a best finish of T6 at the 2017 Fatima Bint Mubarak Ladies Open.

Dryburgh has played on the LPGA Tour since 2018. Her best finish is T-21 at the 2018 Cambia Portland Classic and the 2019 Pure Silk Championship. She made her major championship debut at the 2019 Women's PGA Championship.

Amateur wins
2010 Feather Sound Open
2012 Old Waverly Bulldog Invite

Source:

Professional wins (5)

LPGA Tour wins (1)

^ Co-sanctioned with LPGA of Japan Tour

ALPG Tour wins (1)
2017 Oatlands Ladies Pro Am

Other wins (3)
2020 Rose Ladies Series – Event 3 Rose Ladies Series – Event 4
2021 Rose Ladies Series at JCB

World ranking
Position in Women's World Golf Rankings at the end of each calendar year.

Team appearances
Amateur
European Ladies' Team Championship (representing Scotland): 2013, 2014
Curtis Cup (representing Great Britain & Ireland): 2014
Espirito Santo Trophy (representing Scotland): 2014
Sources:

References

External links

Scottish female golfers
Ladies European Tour golfers
ALPG Tour golfers
LPGA Tour golfers
Tulane Green Wave athletes
Sportspeople from Aberdeen
1993 births
Living people